How to Draw a Perfect Circle (Portuguese: Como Desenhar um Círculo Perfeito) is a 2009 Portuguese drama film directed by Marco Martins and starring Rafael Morais, Daniel Duval, Joana de Verona, Beatriz Batarda, and Albano Jeronimo. Its plot revolves around a young man named Guilherme and his sister Sofia who grow up sharing experiences and slowly discover their sexuality. The thing that Sofia doesn't know is how far Guilherme will go to keep her inside his own perverse, dark and perfect circle.

Cast
 Rafael Morais
 Daniel Duval
 Joana de Verona
 Beatriz Batarda
 Lourdes Norberto

Synopsis
Guilherme (Rafael Morais) and his sister, Sofia (Joana de Verona), live in their grandmother's mansion, occasionally looked in on by their unconventional mom (Beatriz Batarda). Their dad, Paul (Daniel Duval), returns to Portugal from Paris, but he is a French intellectual devoid of parenting skills.
Sofia promised Guilherme that when she was ready, he would have the dubious privilege of taking her virginity. The randy young man starts getting impatient, unable to satisfy himself any longer with masturbating by her side. When he spies on his sister apparently having sex with another guy, he feels deeply betrayed. His emotional maelstrom is further exacerbated by the news of their grandmother's death.
As their mother decides to sell the ancestral mansion – another betrayal – Guilherme moves in with Paul. That doesn't work out very well either, and once again he's reduced to self-gratification, this time while watching his father having sex with a prostitute. Just before this scene, while father and son play Tic-Tac-Toe, Paul remarks that Guilherme can draw a perfect circle but always loses the game.

Reception
Bernardo Sassetti won the Award for Best Music at the 5th Festival de Cinema de Países de Língua Portuguesa.

References

External links

2000s Portuguese-language films
2000s French-language films
2009 films
2009 drama films
American romantic drama films
Portuguese drama films
Films about twins
Incest in film
Films directed by Marco Martins
2009 multilingual films
Portuguese multilingual films
2000s American films